Ömer Faruk Yurtseven (born June 19, 1998) is a Turkish professional basketball player for the Miami Heat of the National Basketball Association (NBA). He played college basketball for the NC State Wolfpack and the Georgetown Hoyas.

Early life and career
He was born in Tashkent, Uzbekistan to Turkish parents and played basketball in Turkey and for the Turkish youth national team.
Yurtseven was selected to the Best Five of the 2014 FIBA Europe Under-16 Championship. He was also invited to play at the Jordan Brand Classic International Game.

On March 20, 2015, he made his EuroLeague debut, in a game against Emporio Armani Milano, scoring 2 
points, in 1 minute and 4 seconds of playing time.

On October 5, 2015, he played against the Brooklyn Nets, at the Barclays Center, in Brooklyn, New York. He had 8 points and 7 rebounds, with one block, in 15 minutes and 18 seconds of playing time, in his team's win over the Nets. He would become the youngest player in history at the time to play in an NBA preseason game, at 17 years old.

During an Under-18 youth age competition in Turkey, Yurtseven recorded a double-double, of 91 points (scoring more points than his entire competition), making 34 out of 49 shots (including five three-pointers), and grabbing 28 rebounds, in a 115–82 win over the youth club of Eylul Basketbol Ihtisas.

On February 15, 2016, he left Fenerbahçe, in order to play college basketball, stating that he needed more playing time than he was receiving with Fenerbahçe.

College career
On May 16, 2016 it was announced that Yurtseven would be playing college basketball at North Carolina State University. However, due to his previous exposure with playing for  Fenerbahçe, in some professional games, the NCAA decided to suspend him for the first nine games of their season (around 30% of the schedule), as well as require him to donate $1,000 to a charity of his choosing, in exchange for him to be fully eligible for playing time moving forward. After fulfilling his suspension, he returned to the court on December 15, in a win against Appalachian State University. On March 14, 2017, Yurtseven would test out his stock for the 2017 NBA draft, leaving open the possibility that he would return to North Carolina State for his sophomore season. After trying out for the 2017 NBA Draft Combine, his father announced he'd be going back to North Carolina State for his sophomore year.

During his sophomore year he would improve his points per game average from 5.9 to 13.5. This significant increase gained him All-ACC Third Team honors. On March 21, 2018, Yurtseven would test out going pro once again for the 2018 NBA draft. However, even if he stayed in college, he confirmed that he would not return to North Carolina State and would instead request a transfer to a different university.

On April 16, 2018, Yurtseven announced he would transfer to Georgetown. He became eligible to play for the Hoyas starting in the 2019–20 season and will have two years of eligibility remaining. Yurtseven had 20 points in his debut for Georgetown, an 81–68 win over Mount St. Mary's. He averaged 15.5 points and 9.8 rebounds per game but missed seven games with an ankle injury. On April 28, 2020, he announced that he was entering the 2020 NBA draft and was not returning to Georgetown.

Professional career

Oklahoma City Blue (2021)
After going undrafted in the 2020 NBA draft, Yurtseven signed an Exhibit 10 deal with the Oklahoma City Thunder on December 8, 2020. He was waived next day. On January 28, 2021, Yurtseven was included in roster of the Oklahoma City Blue, the NBA G League affiliate of the Oklahoma City Thunder.

Miami Heat (2021–present)
On May 14, 2021, Yurtseven signed with the Miami Heat. On August 1, he joined the Heat for the NBA Summer League and five days later re-signed with the Heat. On December 26, Yurtseven made his first career start, putting up 16 points and 15 rebounds in a 93–83 win over the Orlando Magic.

National team career
Yurtseven was a member of the junior national teams of Turkey. With Turkey's junior national teams, he played at the 2013 FIBA Europe Under-16 Championship, and at the 2014 FIBA Europe Under-16 Championship, where he was named to the All-Tournament Team. He also played at the 2015 FIBA Europe Under-18 Championship, where he won a silver medal, and at the 2016 FIBA Europe Under-20 Championship, where he won a bronze medal, and was named to the All-Tournament Team. He finished his career with Turkey's junior national teams at the 2017 FIBA Europe Under-20 Championship.

Career statistics

NBA

Regular season

|-
| style="text-align:left;"|
| style="text-align:left;"|Miami
| 56 || 12 || 12.6 || .526 || .091 || .623 || 5.3 || .9 || .3 || .4 || 5.3
|- class="sortbottom"
| style="text-align:center;" colspan="2"|Career
| 56 || 12 || 12.6 || .526 || .091 || .623 || 5.3 || .9 || .3 || .4 || 5.3

Playoffs

|-
| style="text-align:left;"|2022
| style="text-align:left;"|Miami
| 9 || 0 || 4.2 || .667 || .000 || .333 || .8 || .3 || .0 || .1 || 2.8
|- class="sortbottom"
| style="text-align:center;" colspan="2"|Career
| 9 || 0 || 4.2 || .667 || .000 || .333 || .8 || .3 || .0 || .1 || 2.8

College

|-
| style="text-align:left;"|2016–17
| style="text-align:left;"|NC State
| 22 || 14 || 18.9 || .457 || .333 || .719 || 4.4 || 1.2 || .2 || .7 || 5.9
|-
| style="text-align:left;"|2017–18
| style="text-align:left;"|NC State
| 33 || 22 || 23.8 || .572 || .500 || .613 || 6.7 || .5 || .5 || 1.8 || 13.5
|-
| style="text-align:left;"|2018–19
| style="text-align:left;"|Georgetown
| style="text-align:center;" colspan="11"| Redshirt
|-
| style="text-align:left;"|2019–20
| style="text-align:left;"|Georgetown
| 26 || 25 || 27.3 || .534 || .214 || .753 || 9.8 || 1.2 || .5 || 1.5 || 15.5
|- class="sortbottom"
| style="text-align:center;" colspan="2"|Career
| 81 || 61 || 23.6 || .539 || .426 || .693 || 7.1 || .9 || .4 || 1.4 || 12.1

Personal life
Yurtseven is interested in playing chess and named Magnus Carlsen his favorite chess player.

See also
 List of youngest EuroLeague players

References

External links

 NC State Wolfpack bio
 Georgetown Hoyas bio

1998 births
Living people
Centers (basketball)
Fenerbahçe men's basketball players
Georgetown Hoyas men's basketball players
Miami Heat players
National Basketball Association players from Turkey
NC State Wolfpack men's basketball players
Oklahoma City Blue players
Sportspeople from Tashkent
Turkish expatriate basketball people in the United States
Turkish men's basketball players
Undrafted National Basketball Association players